Acquafraggia (also Acqua Fraggia) is a short and frequently steep torrente, or seasonal stream, of the province of Sondrio in Lombardy, north Italy.

From here it flows in a southwesterly direction within the territory of the commune of Piuro until it joins the Mera as a right tributary at the locality of Borgonuovo, a little upstream from Chiavenna and the mouth of the Val Bregaglia.

This has been a protected area since 1983.

References
Monumento Naturale Cascate dell'Acquafraggia

Rivers of the Province of Sondrio
Val Bregaglia
Waterfalls of Lombardy
Rivers of Italy